Michel Cadotte (July 22, 1764 – July 8, 1837) (also spelled Michael, and the surname as Cadott, Cadeau, and other variations), Kechemeshane in Ojibwe (or Gichi-miishen in the contemporary spelling, meaning "Great Michel") was a Métis fur trader of Ojibwe and French-Canadian descent. He dominated the business in the area of the south shore of Lake Superior.

He gained a strategic alliance through marriage to Equawasay, the daughter of the head of the White Crane clan; men from this clan were the hereditary chiefs of the Lake Superior Ojibwe. Cadotte's trading post at La Pointe on Madeline Island was a critical center for the trade between the Lake Superior band and the British and United States trading companies.

Early life and education
Cadotte was born July 22, 1764, as the second son to a French father and an Anishinaabe mother in present-day Sault Ste. Marie, Michigan, which had been recently taken over by the British after their victory against France in the Seven Years' War. He had an older brother and they grew up with their mother's Ojibwe people. His father Jean Baptiste Cadotte, Sr., became a fur trader for French and later British interests in and around the eastern end of Lake Superior. Michel's paternal grandfather was a Frenchman named Cadeau, and he had come to Lake Superior in the late 17th century on a French exploratory mission.

Michel's mother was a member of the powerful Owaazsii (Bullhead) clan of the Anishinaabeg.  She is frequently described in historic records as having high status in the region and as being an exceptionally kind person. She was a Roman Catholic convert whose French name was likely Marianne or Anastasia. His parents sent Michel and his brother John Baptiste Jr. to Montreal for their education in French Catholic schools.

Cadotte Sr. pressed westward as a trader along the south shore of Lake Superior and set up a  trading post on Mooningwanekaaning (Madeline Island), in Chequamegon Bay in modern-day Wisconsin.  The traditional center of the Lake Superior Ojibwe, the island had previously had a French trading post. As Michel Cadotte reached adulthood, he frequently traveled west with his father and older brother Jean Baptiste, Jr. (more often called John Baptiste Cadotte).

Jean Baptiste Sr. retired in 1796 and left his holdings to his sons. John Baptiste Jr. explored westward to Fond du Lac and later to Red Lake in present-day Minnesota. Michel Cadotte settled at La Pointe on Mooningwanekaaning, then called St. Michel Island.

Marriage and family
At La Pointe, Cadotte married Ikwesewe, the daughter of the head of the White Crane clan of the Anishinaabe. This was an advantageous marriage, as the males of the Cranes were selected as the hereditary chiefs of the Lake Superior band. Cadotte became the lead trader on the south shore of Lake Superior, and would remain so for decades. Similarly, the head of the White Crane clan believed it advantageous to have a strong alliance with the fur trader through his daughter's marriage. Ikwesewe and Cadotte had several children. Two of their daughters married American fur traders, the brothers Lyman and Truman Warren.

Career
Working for the British North West Company and later the American Fur Company, Cadotte built a trading empire throughout northern Wisconsin. He established outposts at the head of the Chippewa River, and at Lac Courte Oreilles. Born just after the collapse of New France after Great Britain's victory in the Seven Years' War, Cadotte had a career that peaked toward the later decades of the great fur trade. Many Métistraders, similar to him, were prominent in the Great Lakes area on behalf of British and American companies.

Cadotte and his brother Jean Baptiste were generous and well-liked; they proved instrumental in brokering peace and commerce in the region.  Literate and able to speak fluent Ojibwe, English, and French, Cadotte often acted as an intermediary between the Ojibwe and the governments of Canada and the United States. He held considerable political influence; for example, he persuaded most of the Lake Superior Ojibwe to stay out of Tecumseh's Rebellion.

Cadotte retired in 1823 and left his business to his two American sons-in-law, the brothers Lyman and Truman Warren. He died on July 8, 1837, and was buried at La Pointe.

Jean Baptiste Cadotte
His father, Jean Baptiste Cadotte, was an interpreter for the French at Sault Ste. Marie at the time of the British conquest in the Seven Years' War. Alexander Henry the elder met him and spent the winter of 1762-63 with him and his wife Catherine Marcot Cadotte, who was of Odawa-French parentage. In 1767 Cadotte and Henry re-founded the post at Michipicoten.

In 1775 Cadotte and Henry took £2,236 worth of goods from Montreal to the region of the new Hudson's Bay Company (HBC) post at Cumberland House, Saskatchewan. Cadotte went to Fort des Prairies while Henry went up the Sturgeon-Weir River.

Legacy and honors
 Mooningwanekaaning Island, designated Île St. Michel by the French in the 17th century, became more widely known as Michael's Island, after Cadotte, during the 19th and into the early 20th century.
 Since then, the island has become associated with his wife Ikwesewe, who lived into her nineties. Her Catholic saint's name was Madeline, for whom the island is named.
 Cadott, Wisconsin in Chippewa County, Wisconsin was named for him.
 One of the grandsons of the Cadottes, William Whipple Warren, was also born in La Pointe. A native speaker of Ojibwe, he was elected as a legislator from Minnesota Territory in 1851. He wrote the first history of the Ojibwe people, combining oral traditions and European-American style of documentation. It was published in 1885 and reprinted in 2009. 
 The Cadottes have numerous living descendants throughout Ojibwe Country, especially in the Red Cliff area.

See also
Chief Buffalo
Charles Michel de Langlade
Pierre Grignon
Alexander Henry the elder

References 

Warren, William W. History of the Ojibway People 1885.

External links

1764 births
1837 deaths
American fur traders
American Métis people
American people of Ojibwe descent
People from La Pointe, Wisconsin
People from Sault Ste. Marie, Michigan
Métis fur traders